Bulldog Edition is a 1936 American film directed by Charles Lamont. The film is also known as Lady Reporter in the United Kingdom.

Plot
Newspaper editors Ken Dwyer (Ray Walker) and Evans (Robert Warwick) compete for circulation, and the heart of star reporter/cartoonist Randy Burns (Evalyn Knapp). That is, if accused killer Nick Enright (Cy Kendall) and his moll, “Aggie” (Betty Compson), don't put them permanently out of circulation first.

Cast 
Ray Walker as Ken Dwyer, Daily News Circulation Manager
Evalyn Knapp as Randy Burns, Daily News Reporter / Cartoonist
Regis Toomey as J. M. "Jim" Hardy, Daily News Managing Editor
Cy Kendall as Nick Enright
William Newell as Charlie Hunter, Daily News Reporter
Oscar Apfel as Taggart, Daily News Publisher
Betty Compson as Billie Blake, aka Aggie, Enright's Moll
Robert Warwick as Evans, Post Publisher
Ivan Miller as C.C. Johns, Post Managing Editor
Matty Fain as Henchman Maxie
George Lloyd as Manelli, Racket Man

References

External links 

1936 films
American crime drama films
1930s English-language films
Films directed by Charles Lamont
American black-and-white films
Republic Pictures films
Films produced by Nat Levine
1936 crime drama films
1930s American films